Love Burns is a 1994 Italian comedy film written and directed by Davide Ferrario. It was screened at the 51st Venice International Film Festival, in the Panorama section.

Plot    
Rosario, a philosophy professor in crisis for the end of his marriage, begins - pushed by the Virgin Mary who appears to him constantly - to enjoy life by committing all sorts of crimes. Thanks to his personality change, Rosario will be able to reconnect with his beloved wife.

Cast  
Giuseppe Cederna as Rosario
Elena Sofia Ricci as Elena
Alessandro Haber as Salvatore
Monica Scattini as Virgin Mary
Flavio Bonacci as Bussotti
Doris von Thury as Amelia
Raffaele Fallica as Il Preside
Massimo Ghini as Proprietario della Mercedes 
 Maria Amelia Monti as Proprietaria della Mercedes  
Roberto Citran as The Betrayed Husband
 Elisabetta Cavallotti as La ragazza scippata
 Dario Parisini as Carabiniere
Mariella Valentini as The Woman who Spleeps

See also    
 List of Italian films of 1994

References

External links

 Love Burns at The New York Times

1994 comedy films
1994 films
Italian comedy films
Films directed by Davide Ferrario
1990s Italian films